Ab Kol is a village in Baghlan Province on the Kunduz River. Around the turn of the 20th century, it was said to contain about 80 houses, all of which were inhabited by Ghilzai. Recent maps no longer show the location however.

See also 
Baghlan Province

References

Populated places in Baghlan Province